Michael Culme-Seymour may refer to one of three naval commanders of the Royal Navy, father, son and grandson:

Sir Michael Culme-Seymour, 3rd Baronet (1836–1920), Admiral, Commander-in-Chief at Portsmouth, commanded the Mediterranean and Channel fleets and the Pacific squadron, also Vice-Admiral of the United Kingdom
Sir Michael Culme-Seymour, 4th Baronet (1867–1925), Vice-Admiral, served during World War I, Commander-in-Chief on the North America and West Indies Station, and Second Sea Lord
Sir Michael Culme-Seymour, 5th Baronet (1909–1999), Commander, served during World War II, High Sheriff of Northamptonshire

See also
Sir Michael Seymour, 1st Baronet, Admiral, grandfather to the 3rd Baronet (the 2nd Baronet took the name "Culme")
Michael Seymour (Royal Navy officer), Admiral, uncle to the 3rd Baronet